Jefferson Township is one of the ten townships of Fayette County, Ohio, United States. As of the 2010 census the population was 2,636, of whom 1,419 lived in the unincorporated portions of the township.

Geography
Located in the northwestern corner of the county, it borders the following townships:
Stokes Township, Madison County - north
Paint Township - east
Union Township - southeast
Jasper Township - south
Silvercreek Township, Greene County - southwest
Ross Township, Greene County - northwest

Two villages are located in Jefferson Township: Jeffersonville, the second largest municipality in Fayette County, in the center, and part of Octa in the southwest.

Name and history
It is one of twenty-four Jefferson Townships statewide.

Government
The township is governed by a three-member board of trustees, who are elected in November of odd-numbered years to a four-year term beginning on the following January 1. Two are elected in the year after the presidential election and one is elected in the year before it. There is also an elected township fiscal officer, who serves a four-year term beginning on April 1 of the year after the election, which is held in November of the year before the presidential election. Vacancies in the fiscal officership or on the board of trustees are filled by the remaining trustees.

References

External links
County website

Townships in Fayette County, Ohio
Townships in Ohio